Robert Douglas McKelvie (1 July 1912 – 5 January 1996) was an English cricketer. Mckelvie was a right-handed batsman who occasionally fielded as a wicket-keeper. He was born in Blofield, Norfolk and educated at Malvern College, where he represented the college cricket team.

McKelvie made a single appearance for Buckinghamshire in the 1947 Minor Counties Championship against Hertfordshire. During the following season, he made his only first-class appearance for the Free Foresters against Cambridge University. He scored 10 runs in the Free Foresters first-innings, before being dismissed by Trevor Bailey. In their second-innings he scored 12 runs before being dismissed by Hugh Griffiths.

He died in Banbury, Oxfordshire on 5 January 1996.

References

External links
Robert McKelvie at ESPNcricinfo
Robert McKelvie at CricketArchive

1912 births
1996 deaths
People from Blofield
People educated at Malvern College
English cricketers
Buckinghamshire cricketers
Free Foresters cricketers